The Belarusian Ground Forces is a service branch of the Armed Forces of Belarus.

History 
The ground forces were founded on March 20, 1992, on the same day the Defence Ministry of Belarus was established. By 1994, the ground forces had over 50,000 troops, most being former soldiers of the Soviet Army's Belorussian Military District. The army equipment which was used at the time included 79 T-54s, 639 T-55s, 291 T-62s, 299 T-64s, 8 T-80s, and 1,800 T-72s.

In December 2001, the Ground Forces underwent a major reorganization which produced two operational-territorial commands which are similar to Russia's military districts. The two commands that were formed from this reorganization were the Western Operational Command at Grodno, and the North Western Operational Command, at Barysaw. At around the same time, the headquarters of the Ground Forces was established on the basis of the former 5th Guards Tank Army. The ground forces headquarters was abolished during reorganization in 2011 and replaced by combat training and territorial defense directorates. The change further confirmed the Belarusian Ground Forces integration into the Russian military command structure as Belarus thus does not independently plan or conduct large-scale exercises and operates under Russian command during joint exercises. As of mid-2021 the units of the operational commanders were manned at half strength, making them unready for rapid response combat operations.

Structure

Headquarters (Minsk) 
 Headquarters of the Armed Forces 
 Exemplary Military Band
 Honor Guard of the Armed Forces of Belarus
 465th Missile Brigade
 336th Missile Artillery Brigade
 51st Guards Mixed Artillery Group
 188th Engineer Brigade 
 52nd Specialized Search Battalion  
 Cynological Center of the Armed Forces

Western Operational Command 
 6th Guards Kyiv-Berlin Mechanised Brigade
 11th Guards Berlin-Carpathian Mechanised Brigade
 111th Artillery Brigade
 1199th Mixed Artillery Regiment 
 557th Engineering Brigade  
 74th Separate Communications Regiment 
 815th Maintenance Center 
28th Storage Base 
48th Separate Electronic Warfare Battalion 
230th Combined-Arms Training Ground 
117th Navigation and Topographic Unit 
250th Separate Guard and Service Battalion 
 108th Material Support Brigade

North Western Operational Command 
 120th Mechanised Brigade
 19th Guards Mechanized Brigade
231st Artillery Brigade
86th Communications Brigade
42nd Separate Radio Engineering Battalion
244th Center for Electronic Intelligence
7th Engineer Regiment
60th Separate Communications Regiment
814th Maintenance Center
34th Storage Base
37th Guards Weapons and Equipment Storage Base
110th Separate Logistics Regiment
10th Separate Electronic Warfare Battalion
227th Combined-Arms Training Ground
 22nd Rocket Brigade (until 2005)
 51st Guards Artillery Brigade
 72nd Guards Joint Training Centre

Specialized forces 
The specialized forces are designed to support the combat activities of the Ground Forces and solve their inherent tasks. They include formations and military units of intelligence, communications, engineering, radiation, chemical and biological defense, electronic warfare, navigation and topographic.

Electronic Warfare Troops
Signal Troops
Engineer Troops
NBC Protection Troops
Topographic Navigation Service

Signals Troops 
The Signal Troops are separate special forces that act as the communications system between troops in the Armed Forces and territorial troops. It is grounded in communications and command and control equipment, radio intelligence and special radio equipment communication. The official holiday of the Signal Troops is 20 October, which was the day in 1919 when the Department of Communications of the Red Army was formed. Over the course of post-war years, with the transition of the troops to a peaceful situation, the communications troops of the Belarusian Military District, and later the Armed Forces of the Republic of Belarus, took measures to restore and develop the stationary communications system, deploy communication systems of garrisons and military camps, and conditions. In 2019, the Ministry of Communications and Informatization commemorated its centennial with a holiday stamp.

NBC Protection Troops 
The Nuclear, Biological and Chemical Protection Troops are the forces designed to endure their combat tasks in conditions of radioactive, chemical and biological contamination, For about ten years, as part of a limited contingent of Soviet Army, chemical troops fought in Afghanistan, where such chemical support tasks as the use of flamethrowing incendiary agents and aerosols were effective in combating rebels. Many representatives of the chemical troops participating in the war were awarded military orders and medals.

In the course of eliminating the consequences of the Chernobyl disaster, given the training and technical equipment of the chemical forces, they were assigned some of the most difficult work. The Department of Chemical Forces was created on 1 June 1992 on the basis of the disbanded Directorate of the Belarusian Military District and was included in the General Staff of the Armed Forces. On 21 December 2001, in connection with the creation of the General Staff of the Armed Forces of the Republic of Belarus, the department of chemical forces of the Main Headquarters of the Armed Forces was reorganized and included in it as a department of the Republican Chemical Chemistry for Protection and Ecology of the General Staff of the Armed Forces.

Commanders of the Ground Forces 

 Major General Alexander Nikitin (-17 April 2012)

Equipment

Infantry weapons

Small arms

Vehicles

References 

Military of Belarus
Armies by country
Military units and formations established in 1992